Assassins is a 1995 American action thriller film directed by Richard Donner. The screenplay was written by The Wachowskis and Brian Helgeland. The film stars Sylvester Stallone and Antonio Banderas and costars Julianne Moore. The Wachowskis stated that their script was completely rewritten by Helgeland, and that they tried to remove their names from the film but failed.

Plot
Assassin Robert Rath plans to retire, haunted by the memory of murdering his mentor Nicolai several years ago. While on an assignment, Miguel Bain, another assassin, manages to eliminate Rath’s target first. Bain then reveals his plan to kill Rath and become the world’s best assassin.

As Rath tries to figure out who sent Bain, his contractor offers him a lucrative job that could allow him to retire: kill a computer hacker named Electra, the four Dutch buyers of a computer disk she possesses, and to retrieve the disk. Electra has set up CCTV cameras and an elaborate mechanism for remotely moving items between rooms in the building where she is based.

At the hotel where the buy is to be executed, Bain finds and kills the four dutchmen first, who he discovers to be Interpol agents. After finding out Bain is after the same target as he is once again, Rath spares Electra, and the two escape with the disk.

Scared by the whole situation, Electra runs away from Rath to her house. Both Bain and Rath separately track her down. During the ensuing fight, Bain kills Electra's neighbors and is about to kill her when Rath intervenes. Realizing Rath does not want to kill her, Electra decides to trust him.

Rath exchanges the disk for his fee, given to him in a briefcase. However, the briefcase turns out to contain a bomb placed by his contractor in an attempt to kill him. After surviving the attempt on his life, Rath is told by Electra that she had swapped the disk, unsure if he would come back. Rath demands a greatly increased fee from his contractor, this time to be wired to a bank in Puerto Rico.

The contractor then hires Bain to kill Rath. Rath and Electra travel to the bank where he identifies the decrepit, abandoned hotel that Bain will use as a sniper post and plans a trap.

Fifteen years ago, an afternoon in which Nikolai was getting out of that same bank, Rath used the building to shoot at him.

The trap works and Rath manages to both get the money and shoot at Bain multiple times. After Bain's apparent death, Nicolai appears, revealing that he had had a bulletproof vest on when Rath shot him. Knowing that Nicolai would kill him too, Bain joins Rath in shooting him dead. Bain still plans to kill Rath and become number one. Electra puts on her sunglasses, allowing Rath to see Bain; Rath shoots through his jacket to kill him. After Bain's death, Rath and Electra leave the place, take her cat and reveal that their true names are Joseph and Anna respectively.

Cast
Sylvester Stallone as Robert Rath/Joseph Rath
Antonio Banderas as Miguel Bain
Julianne Moore as Electra/Anna
Anatoly Davydov as Nicolai Tashlinkov
Muse Watson as Ketcham
Steve Kahan as Alan Branch
Kai Wulff as Remy
Mark Coates as Jereme Kyle
Kelly Rowan as Jennifer
Reed Diamond as Bob

Production
The original spec screenplay was written by The Wachowskis and sold for $1 million to producer Joel Silver around the same time he bought their script for The Matrix, also for $1 million. The script was similar to the final product, but with a more developed love story between Rath and Electra and a briefer ending without the character of Nicolai. Joel Silver offered Richard Donner $10 million to direct, but Donner insisted the script be rewritten to tone down the violence and make the central character more sympathetic and brought in Brian Helgeland, who did a page one rewrite and earned a co-screenwriter credit. The Wachowskis attempted to remove their name from the film but were refused by the Writers Guild of America.

The film was shot in Seattle, Washington, San Juan, Puerto Rico and Portland, Oregon.

Reception
The film received mostly negative press, and on the film-critic aggregator Rotten Tomatoes received 16% positive reviews based on 50 reviews, with an average rating of 3.71/10. The script was heavily criticized for being confusing and dull. Stallone's performance in the film earned him a Golden Raspberry Award nomination for Worst Actor (also for Judge Dredd), but lost the trophy to Pauly Shore for Jury Duty.

About the reception, Richard Donner said:"I thought Stallone did one of the best jobs he's ever done. He underplayed, he was quiet, he found the character and he went with it. I thought Antonio Banderas was wonderful. The picture came out, and it did not do very well at all. Sure, it hurts and you know why you wish it would do better? The studio gave you a lot of money and you want them to make their money back so that other people can make movies (...) Warners have been good to us and gave us money to make that movie. And I thought we did a good job and they thought we did a good job, but the audiences and critics didn't like it. Did I feel bad? Sure. Did it get me down? Nope, nope, nope — too lucky to be in this business to be down in the dumps."

Box office
Assassins debuted at No. 2 at the box office. The film grossed $30.3 million in the US and another $53 million worldwide, for a total of $83.3 million.

Audiences polled by CinemaScore gave the film an average grade of "B" on an A+ to F scale.

References

External links
 
 
 Original screenplay by the Wachowskis
 Screenplay revised by Brian Helgeland

1995 films
1995 action thriller films
1990s chase films
American action thriller films
American chase films
Day of the Dead films
1990s English-language films
Films about contract killing
Films about snipers
Films directed by Richard Donner
Films produced by Joel Silver
Films with screenplays by Brian Helgeland
Films set in Puerto Rico
Films set in Seattle
Films shot in Portland, Oregon
Films shot in Washington (state)
Films with screenplays by The Wachowskis
Silver Pictures films
Warner Bros. films
Films scored by Mark Mancina
1990s American films